Raúl Schiaffino (born 7 December 1923, date of death unknown) was a Uruguayan footballer. He played in two matches for the Uruguay national football team in 1945 and 1946. He was also part of Uruguay's squad for the 1946 South American Championship.

References

1923 births
Year of death missing
Uruguayan footballers
Uruguay international footballers
Place of birth missing
Association football forwards
Peñarol players